Whitley Secondary School (WSS) is a co-educational government secondary school located in Bishan, Singapore.

History
The school was originally located at Whitley Road, and was officially opened on 1 October 1965. In March 1992, the school was relocated to Bishan Street 24 at a cost of S$16 million.

In 2006, the school celebrated its 40th anniversary and had its first musical gala followed by a musical festival night. On 22 October that year, the school organised a carnival where goods and art pieces were sold to raise funds for the major renovation of the Bishan campus.

The school was temporarily located at 430 Lorong 1 Toa Payoh, Singapore 319759 from 2006 to 2007.

Notable alumni 

 Valen Low - Professional armwrestler 
 Jack Sim - Founder of World Toilet Organization

References

External links
Official website
E-Portal site for Whitley Secondary School
 News reporting video
Singapore Mountaineers

Educational institutions established in 1965
Schools in Bishan, Singapore
Schools in Central Region, Singapore
Secondary schools in Singapore
Toa Payoh
1965 establishments in Singapore